The People's Liberation Army Navy (PLAN) is the naval branch of the People's Liberation Army (PLA), the armed forces of the People's Republic of China. The PLAN force consists of approximately 250,000 men and over a hundred major combat vessels, organized into three fleets: the North Sea Fleet, the East Sea Fleet, and the South Sea Fleet.

Most of the naval weapon systems used by the PLAN were developed prior to 1990. The naval weaponry of the PLAN is based on three tiers: artillery, torpedoes, and missiles, each geared to a specific threat range and type.

History
Throughout its early history from 1949 to the early 1980s, the PLAN had principally relied upon artillery and torpedoes as its main weapons. This resulted in the development of many types and calibers of anti-aircraft and anti-ship guns. Torpedoes were secondary weapons, playing an important role in PLAN's coastal defense doctrines. Many destroyers, frigates and torpedo craft all carry an array of anti-ship torpedoes to this day.

The adoption of the missile, like in most navies, has completely revolutionized Chinese naval capabilities and tactics. Also, there has been growing attention given to ASW, electronic, and airborne weaponry.

The Cultural Revolution was a major disruption to many weapons development programs of the PLAN. Advanced weaponry concepts were always in the minds of PLAN thinkers since the 1950s, even if they were unable to be implemented at the time. Therefore, a lot of modern weapon systems such as SAMs, modernized torpedoes and missile/sensor systems were not introduced into service until the early 1980s. Furthermore, economic and technical sophistication to produce the fire control, targeting systems, and tracking capabilities were not in place until the mid-1980s.

Artillery systems

In the PLAN, artillery takes the form of anti-ship guns and anti-aircraft guns. Anti-ship guns are typically found on destroyers and cruisers, with smaller versions on frigates. Smaller ships utilize torpedoes for anti-ship weaponry. The increasing use of missiles means less attention is paid to pure anti-ship weapons. The PLAN never possessed battleships or battlecruisers, and the use of a ship's main guns is mostly in standoff capacity, as they have never engaged in close-shore support from cruisers or destroyers.

Anti-aircraft guns vary in size and power from swivel-mount 25 mm machine guns to advanced Close-In Weapon Systems (CIWS) and radar-assisted 57 mm rapid-fire anti-aircraft weapons. Almost all classes of PLAN vessels maintain at least some anti-aircraft capability. Most destroyers and cruisers augment this with surface-to-air missiles.

Older and legacy artillery systems currently in use

The most commonly carried artillery system in most indigenous ships is the 37 mm anti-aircraft artillery (Type-61/76). This is a manually operated gun, with a gun crew on an open mount. The Type 61 is carried by most Chinese surface combatants, ranging from the small Shanghai and Hainan coastal combat vessels to the largest combatants of the Luda and Jianghu class. These guns are highly limited—they can be operated only in clear weather conditions and are effective only in daylight conditions since they lack radar coordination or any form of automatic or autonomous targeting. They are, however, economical and highly reliable. Their firepower has been effectively utilized not only against aircraft but also against surface and land targets.

The old manually operated Type-61 37 mm weapon is gradually being phased out in favor of automatic weaponry, but it nonetheless remains on board many littoral and major combatant vessels. In addition to the manual 37 mm, there is the Type-66 57 mm (120 rounds per minute at 12,000 m) and Type-61 25 mm cannon systems (800 rounds per minute at 2,500 m). These are also manually mounted. The 57 mm is prominent on board the Hainan class and several LSTs. This system like the 37 mm is almost totally ineffective  against modern jet aircraft and incoming missiles. However it has been combat proven to be effective against enemy shipping, particularly in the Sino-Vietnamese naval battle near the Spratley Islands on several occasions.

The 25 mm is a one-man operated weapon that complements the larger caliber artillery systems. It remains as a popular gun mount on smaller vessels, particularly landing ships and mine warfare designs. Machine guns such as the 12.7 mm and 14.5 mm are also classified as automatic weapons; being widely operated as short-range self-defense weapons on most amphibious craft. The majority of Chinese naval auxiliary ships possess manually operated anti-aircraft artillery, in contrast to the majority of Western navies, which have few or no armaments on board their auxiliaries.

Current ship artillery systems

Anti-aircraft

Anti-aircraft artillery remains important to PLAN combatants, but its concept has been radically changed recently. All new combatants and those that have been upgraded now possess a fully automatic variant of the 37 mm cannon. This system is known as the Type 76A dual anti-aircraft artillery system (180 rounds per minute engaging at 4,500 m). The Type 76A is a direct descendant of the Type 76 twin 37 mm gun, which in turn, is the successor of Type 61 manual twin 37 mm gun. Although the Type 76 twin 37 mm gun is fully automatic, it has an open turret and thus is subject to harsh environment, which causes reliability problems. Another shortcoming of the Type 76 twin 37 mm gun is that like its manually operated predecessor, it lacks fire control systems.

Type 76A twin 37 mm gun was thus developed to solve these problems by introducing an enclosed turret and fire control systems. A fire control radar guides these weapons, and can engage targets in most conditions. There is also an optronic device that enables manual and optical aiming. The Type 76F is a Type 76A system with simplified fire control system, which has the electrooptic system but not the radar. Also, there is a console for one human operator inside the gun mount for local manual control, though the gun can be fully automated. Unlike the old manual mounts that require a full crew of men to steer, aim, load, and fire the weapon, the Type 76F requires only one operator to aim the system. In addition to the 37 mm guns, a number of Russian AK-230 were also purchased and reverse engineered (as Type 69) for small boats.

Anti-ship

Most PLAN surface combatants in the class of destroyer and frigate operate a main gun (mostly a forward turret, and many ships have an aft turret as well). Anti-surface artillery has been primarily based on Soviet designs of 76 mm to 130 mm designs. The Type-76 130 mm twin mount is the main artillery mount on the Luda class destroyers. A more indigenized ship artillery gun system was the Type 79 dual 100 mm gun (as well as single versions). The gun can be operated with one operator or completely automatically guided by radar or optronic aiming. These guns can achieve accurate fire at roughly 25 rounds a minute. A new indigenous 100 mm mount is available on the latest combatants; this is a single rapid fire weapon similar to the French Creusot-Loire weapon. Newer indigenous 130 mm gun systems are also under development.

Close-in weapons systems

Many navies in the world operate a variety of Close In Weapons Systems (CIWS). These systems are designed to engage high speed, low altitude targets at close range. One particular target for the CIWS is incoming anti-ship missiles. A CIWS with its rapid fire and radar control could hopefully defeat incoming missiles. China until very recently has mostly lacked a CIWS system. The Russian built Sovremenny class destroyers that were purchased in a 1996 deal gave China its first CIWS capability. These used a CIWS called the AK630, with mounts that  were exclusive to the Russian ships. China, however, has more recently been either able to reverse engineer the AK630 or buy the cannon turrets. These have been fitted on board the Type 054 Ma'anshan class frigates and the new Type 220X missile attack craft.

A Chinese system, the Type 730, is China's first entirely indigenous CIWS. Though externally similar to the Dutch Goalkeeper, it is thought to operate indigenous radar and optical systems. It has seven barrels, and fires 30 mm caliber shells in rapid succession (4,500-5,800 rounds per minute). This system has been fitted on board the 052B, 052C and 051C destroyers so far, and is expected to replace some Type 76 mounts on older combatants, as well as being standard for all new surface combatants. The purchase of two additional Sovremenny class destroyers will give PLAN the Kashtan CIWS system (gun and SAM combination).

Remote Weapons Stations
ORW-1
CS/LK4
H/PJ-15
H/PJ-17

Torpedoes, mines and ASW weaponry
The torpedo is no longer an important anti-ship weapon in the PLAN. However it was very dominant among the coastal attack craft. With the success of torpedo boats in World War I and World War II, the PLAN sought the use of torpedoes in its defense as well. The agility of small coastal craft coupled with fast torpedoes was a grave threat for larger combat vessels. The 1950s, 1960s and 1970s saw a large number of torpedo craft built (as many as 200 operated at one stage). In later years, however, with the increasing inability to even detect Russian or American submarines, the PLAN shifted emphasis from torpedoes to ASW applications and submarines. While most surface combat vessels have some torpedo capability, it is secondary and some ships do not feature torpedo tubes at all.

History and older torpedoes in use
The torpedo programs of the People's Republic of China was set up under the guidance of the former Soviet Union in the 1950s, when China built two torpedo factories under Soviet direction, and began its license assembly of unguided straight-running torpedoes. In April 1958, Naval Arms Ministry of People's Liberation Army Navy (PLAN) established torpedo research institute indigenously. Four months later, the deputy chief-of-staff of PLA Zhang Aiping and the deputy commander-in-chief of LAN Luo Shunchu (罗舜初) led a military delegation to visit former-Soviet Union signed a deal with Soviets to produce three types of Soviet torpedoes in China. In comparison with other military programs, each with dozens or even hundreds of Soviet advisors, however, former-Soviet Union did not put that much emphasis on the torpedo capability: the total number of Soviet advisors initially sent to China for all of its torpedo programs was only five.

The Soviet Union quickly delivered the samples and technical information of the three types of torpedoes to China with the five advisors to China as promised. Two Soviet advisors were assigned to assist China to produce the RAT-52 rocket-powered torpedo, while others were assigned to teach China about compressed oxygen and SAET-60 passive homing acoustic homing torpedoes. In July 1960, the first two samples of Chinese-built rocket-propelled torpedoes were completed. The propulsion system and electronics of the electrically powered passive acoustic homing torpedo had also been completed, while the basic technologies of compressed oxygen torpedoes was also mastered by China. Everything appeared to be great but the subsequent Sino-Soviet split ended the promising future: from July 28 to September 1, 1960, former Soviet Union had quickly withdrawn all of its advisors from China.

To compound the problem, other domestic political turmoils such as Great Leap Forward and Cultural Revolution had further seriously hindered the indigenous Chinese torpedo developments. As a result, the most numerous torpedoes in Chinese inventory were unguided straight-running torpedoes. In 1978 the PLAN gained significant torpedo capability when a single US Mk 46 Mod.1 block 2 torpedo, thought to be recovered by fishermen, was reverse-engineered and became the Yu-7 ASW torpedo. It is thought that during the 1980s, the Yu-7 design also benefited from subsequent batches of Mk 46 Mod. 2 torpedoes purchased for PLAN from United States for a total US$8 million in 1985. The Yu-7 has become the foundation of PLAN anti-submarine warfare. Yu-7 is mostly seen carried by the Z-9C and Z-8 helicopters, and shipboard variants can be launched from destroyers and frigates.

From October to November 1983, Chinese Northwestern Polytechnical University completed upgrade of the acoustic test facilities under the direction of California Institute of Technology, and this facility played an important role in Chinese torpedo development ever since. In 1993, China ordered three types of Soviet torpedoes along with its purchase of Kilo class submarines: TEST-71, which was replaced by its successor TEST-96 in the 2nd order, and Type 53-65. It is also reported that China had ordered the latest Russian APR-3E light ASW torpedo for its Ka-28 and Be-200 ASW aircraft.

Current torpedoes

Chinese submarines have operated a variety of indigenously designed torpedoes. These range from the basic unguided Yu-1 to the much more long-ranged and highly advanced Yu-6. Little has been documented on PLAN torpedo designs. It was thought that PLAN torpedoes were old and lacked the advanced capabilities to home in against agile or quiet targets.

However, with the delivery of Russian Kilos, China also obtained some highly advanced Russian torpedo designs. One such weapon is the Wake homing torpedo, which homes on a surface ship's wake rather than just sonar readings. It is believed such technology has been applied to new Chinese torpedoes such as the Yu-5. In addition, Jane's Information Group reported, in the late 1990s, that China had already purchased numerous 200-knot Russian Shkval torpedoes from Kazakhstan and was negotiating in purchasing the Soviet torpedo factory there.

Anti-submarine warfare

ASW warfare apart from torpedoes remains a limited area in the PLAN. PLAN vessels have traditionally utilized depth charges and A/S Mortars. PLAN ships also are commonly armed with multi-barreled ASW rocket launchers. These are based on Russian designs, and are capable of firing rocket bombs at short ranges. It is believed to be effective against shallow targets as well as a possible shield of stopping incoming torpedoes. Most PLAN combatants have traditionally two to four multi-barreled launchers in front of the main gun.

There has been evidence that PLAN had embarked on developing a modern ASW rocket system similar to the ASROC. This was a medium-ranged rocket that carried a torpedo as its warhead. The system is known to be CY-1 (and perhaps a new model the CY-3). CY-1 never entered production however, and its status as an active project is in doubt. PLAN forces have had their ASW capabilities somewhat improved with the introduction of Variable Depth Sonar (VDS), which is mounted on some frigates and destroyers. In addition, PLAN helicopters operate dipping sonar and sonobuoys to enhance their detection capabilities. When targets are found, they can drop depth charges, depth bombs or torpedoes.

Mine warfare
Mine warfare has also been another traditional component of PLAN weaponry. Mines remain to be seen as a very useful power amplifying tool by the PLAN. Strategic minefields could be laid around the Taiwan Strait to deny access or delay deployment of US Navy forces, particularly aircraft carrier battle groups and submarines. Chinese mines have continually been addressed by many analysts and scholars as a very dangerous weapon that could be employed against the US Navy.

Most PLAN destroyers, frigates, littoral craft and submarines can lay mines. Chinese mines vary in type, from basic contact/magnetic mines to more modern and complex systems. China first decided to establish dedicated factories for naval mines in 1954, and in 1958, several programs of naval mines were launched simultaneously by Fengxi Machinery Factory. The first of these, Moored-1 (Mao-1), a large sized moored mine entered mass production in 1962 after being tested multiple times and evaluated by the navy. Most early Chinese mines are either Soviet origin, or direct copies of Soviet mines, with the exception of remotely controlled mine.

The first three types of naval mines entered the Chinese service are all moored mines equipped with contact fuses, and all of them are developed by the Fengxi Machinery Factory. Moored-1 is a large sized mine and Moored-2 (Mao-2) is a medium-sized mine, a copy of Soviet KSM mine, and both types require target to strike the mine for detonation. Moored-3 (Mao-3) is a mine with contact wires so that targets would not have to strike the mine itself for detonation, and the mine can be detonated some distance away, still causing enough damage if the target is within range and comes in contact with the contact wire. Moored-1 and Moored-2 entered mass production in 1964 and 1965 respectively.

In the 1970s, China had successfully developed non-contact fuses such as the acoustic fuse, and earlier contact fuse equipped mines were upgraded with non-contact fuses. Also in 1970, Fengxi Machinery Factory and Engineering Technology Equipment Research Institute begun to jointly develop a riverine moored mine that can be remotely controlled fuse. The project was completed in 1974, and the ultrasonic remote control can be either used to arm or disarm the mines, or alternatively, directly detonate the mine.

Since the 1990s, all of mines in the Chinese inventory are upgraded with computerized controls and a new series of Chinese mines were actively marketed for the export, including derivatives from existing mines as well as a brand-new design such as the one similar to American CAPTOR mine.

Chinese naval mines with known designations:

Missiles

The PLAN has three main categories of missiles: anti-ship, anti-air and land-attack.

History and use

Imported missiles

The missile had been an ever-evolving component of PLAN weaponry since the late 1960s. The Soviet Union's assistance to Chinese military developments included the SS-N-2 Styx anti-ship missile technology. Since the 1960s, China has manufactured its own models of anti-ship missile based on the SS-N-2 Styx, in the form of HY-1, SY-1, SY-2, and other airborne and ground-launched systems. The oldest designs have since been phased out, but late variants remain in service. The fundamental shortcoming of missiles based on the SS-N-2 Styx are being short-ranged (only 40–100 km), slow, low in agility, and is rather large and easily detectable targets for modern SAM and CIWS. Later Chinese variants have vastly superior electronics, radar guidance and performance to the older Soviet models. As China has normalized its relationship with the former Soviet Union and then Russia, the importation of Russian missiles resumed, and a new generation of Russian anti-ship missiles have been imported, including the supersonic SS-N-22 and Kh-31, Klub-S, (the Russian equivalent of the anti-shipping version of American BGM-109 Tomahawk), and AS-20 Uran (the Russian equivalent of the air-launched American AGM-84 anti-shipping Harpoon missile).

Indigenous missiles
China's first completely indigenous anti-ship missile program was the YJ8 series. This missile externally appears similar to the French Exocet and American Harpoon, but is essentially a Chinese designed weapon system. The basic YJ8 appeared in the early 1980s, with a short range of 22 miles (40 or so km). It was successful in its test launches however, hitting and sinking targets of up to 10,000 tons with a high hit probability. Unlike older designs, the YJ8 could attack targets at low altitudes to reduce its vulnerability to CIWS, and has greater Electronic Counter Measures (ECM) to prevent enemy jamming. The YJ8 entered widespread service, becoming the standard anti-ship missile on most second and third generation Chinese built warships, ranging from destroyers and frigates, to missile craft and submarines. The missile can also be launched from shore platforms and aircraft.

Several models of the YJ8 have since emerged. The YJ82 was significantly a better missile with a greatly improved range of 120 km and far more advanced ECM. The latest variant is the YJ-83, with a range exceeding 250 km, and capable of making its final approach at Mach 1.5 to penetrate ship defenses. In addition, a variant revealed at 2006 Zhuhai Airshow designated as C-802KD/YJ-82KD has ground attack capabilities similar to the AGM-84 SLAM. All YJ8 models can be launched from a common boxed launcher. Most littoral combatants carry four to six missiles, while larger surface ships can carry eight. PLAN destroyers have mounted sixteen missiles. Though the YJ8 series does not have the advance 'pop up' approach or checkpoint flight characteristics of the Harpoon, it is respected as one of the most potent anti-ship missiles ever developed. The YJ83's performance in some areas is superior to even the latest variants of Harpoon and Exocet, though its ECM and agility is thought to be slightly inferior.

Current missiles
The PLAN inventory includes a mixture of foreign and domestic missiles, and Russia was the largest foreign provider.

Anti-ship missiles

Supersonic anti-ship missiles have been a key development in China. The Russian ramjet SS-N-22 Sunburn is operated by China on board its Sovremenny class destroyers. Its high velocity supersonic approach and its large warhead make the SS-N-22 a valuable weapon for the PLAN. China has long sought to produce its own supersonic and eventually hypersonic anti-ship system since the 1980s. High speed missiles are seen as the most effective means of attacking modern warships. Only Russia, China, and India (BrahMos, which was co-developed with Russia) have so far successfully developed and deployed such weapons.

Earlier Chinese missiles of such capability from before the 1990s include the C-301 (also known as HY-3). With its four ramjet engines, it has a range of 130 km and a speed greater than Mach 2.5. Though a success, the missile is far from being as potent as the SS-N-22, mainly because it can fly only at a higher cruise altitude of 50 m, rather than cruising at wave tops (such as the 20 m cruise altitude of SS-N-22), so it is easier to intercept in comparison to SS-N-22. the PLAN's air force has also purchased both the KH31 ramjet supersonic missile and the AS-20 turbojet subsonic anti-ship missile from Russia to arm its fighters.

Apart from ramjet technology, China has successfully developed some supersonic anti-ship missiles that can fly above Mach 1.0 (as most anti-ship missiles currently fly at Mach 0.9). The C-101, also known as FL-2 features a smaller and thinner body of the original SS-N-2 Styx, but it can fly at speeds around Mach 1.7. It can attack targets at 40 km. However, like the much larger C-301, its cruise altitude is also at 50 m and thus prone to interception in comparison to faster SS-N-22 with lower cruise altitude. As a result, both C-101 and C-301 saw very little service. The YJ83 also possesses some supersonic attack capabilities.

More modern missiles today are the YJ-12 and YJ-91 (KH-31), the most advanced supersonic missiles China has in service. They entered service around 1999 and have a range of 400 km at a speed of Mach 2.5 and can be launched from both ship and air. They can even attack land.

Anti-air missiles

China's navy had long lacked an air defense missile system, hence why it has been a major area of weakness. China's SAM development had been seriously jeopardized by the Cultural Revolution, and the break away from the Soviet Union meant that no Soviet assistance in air defense missiles was given. The first naval SAM system was not developed until the late 1960s. This was in the form of the HQ-61 SAM, originally a short-range land based system. The first PLAN ship to be armed with SAM was the Type 053K frigate Jiangdong, launched in 1970. However it took many years for the design to mature and the obsolete system was never ideal for naval operations. The Jiangdong had two twin launchers of the HQ61 SAM. The missile was capable of engaging enemy air targets out to 10 km. The HQ-61 was applied to only a limited degree. The Jiangwei I class of four units, were armed with a six tube launcher. The weakness, however, was lack of automatic reload systems, so the crew had to manually reload.

When China opened up in the late 1970s, it had greater access to Westernized technologies. One vital asset imported was the French Crotale short-ranged SAM. Two systems were initially imported and mounted aboard two Luda class destroyers. The design was subsequently indigenized into the HQ-7. The improved-Luda, Luhu, Luhai, Jiangwei II, and 054 class warships. The launcher is an eight-celled system, with a reload hatch, which has additional missiles below deck. Its engagement range is 10–12 km and is claimed to be capable of engaging low-flying missiles and aircraft.

Although the HQ-7 was a significant step towards PLAN air defense capabilities, the PLAN still fell short of possessing a medium- to long-range missile system that could provide true fleet defense coverage. The purchase of Russian Sovremenny class destroyers meant China obtained the medium-range SA-N-7 SAM and its subsequent improved models. This missile was far more advanced than any Chinese indigenous design. The missile was soon adapted for service on board the PLAN's 052B class destroyer. China sought to import the Russian SA-N-6 long-range SAM system. This was based on the land based S-300 missile, which China had already been operating.

The SA-N-6 is a vertical launched system (VLS) with a range of 100 km and performance similar to the US Patriot. Two such systems were negotiated for and not ready for installation until late 2005 (on board the new 051C destroyers). Meanwhile, China had developed the HQ-9 system, believed to have partially borrowed some of the features on both Russian S-300 and US Patriot technology (fire control). This was China's first indigenous long-range high-performance air defense missile. This was installed on the 052C class warships.

With VLS missiles finally in service with the PLAN, there has been high optimism to see a short-range VLS weapon that could replace the HQ-7. Contenders for the future short-range SAM of the PLAN include a vertical launched variant of the HQ-7, Russian TOR-M1, Russian SA-N-12, VLS variant of the Chinese LY60N or HQ-61, or a completely new design.

Submarine-launched ballistic missiles and land attack rockets

JL-1 and JL-2 submarine-launched ballistic missiles. The JL-1 was first test fired in 1982 and first successfully launched from the Xia class SSBN in 1987. The JL-1 is currently carried on board China's sole SSBN, the Xia 092. It has 12 launch tubes. Each JL-1 has a range 2,150 km and a single 250-500 kt nuclear warhead. An improved model is in service with a 2,800 km range and possibly higher accuracy. The JL-2 will be the next generation of Chinese SLBM, similar to early variants of the Trident. With a range of 8000 km and multiple warheads (MIRV), this missile is essentially based on the land based DF-31 ICBM design. This means that the future 094 class SSBN can patrol near Chinese waters and launch missiles that could hit the American mainland.

The JL-2 project remains under secret and the status of the 094 is largely unknown. One vessel was reported launched very recently, while the JL-2 missile's development is believed to be in its mature stages.

A single Jianghu I (hull 516) was modified very recently. It has its anti-ship missiles replaced with several multiple-rocket launchers. The rockets are of 122 mm caliber, and are based on the Type 89 system, which is itself quite similar to the Soviet BM-21 rocket system. The 122 mm rockets are launched from a stabilized launcher, meaning that even if the ship is affected by wave motion, the launcher itself will be stabilized. The rockets have a range of up to 40 km, and can achieve reasonable accuracy in fire. This installation may be seen as an experiment by the PLAN to make use of older warship designs, by turning them into shore bombardment platforms. Though only one ship is being tested for now, this is a very possible concept for future PLAN conversions of their large number of old Luda's and Jianghu's. Fire support from ships is seen as very important by the PLAN when conducting amphibious operations.

Cruise missiles

Combat data systems
A combat data system (or combat management system, CDS/CMS) is considered a force multiplier and another revolution of military affairs after World War II, because CDS automates C4I system by integrating information gathered by separate ship-borne sensors into a coherent overall picture, and assisting decision making, and thus boosting the war-fighting capability of ships equipped with such system. However, until the 1980s, Chinese naval vessels has yet to be equipped with such systems. The first combat data system for Chinese navy was indigenous, and subsequent systems trace their origin from Italian and French systems purchased. Three western combat data systems were known to be purchased by China, including British Racal Marine Radar CTC-1629, Italian Alenia SADOC 2, and French Thomson-CSF TAVITAC.  The following Chinese combat systems have been identified:
Type 673-I/Poseidon-1
Type 673-II Poseidon-2/ZKJ-I
Poseidon-3/ZKJ-II
Poseidon-4/ZKJ-3
CCS-1 (For export only)
ZKJ-4
ZKJ-4A
ZKJ-4AG
ZKJ-4B
ZKJ-4BII
ZKJ-5
ZKJ-1
ZKT-1A
ZKT-1B
ZBJ-1
ZBJ-1A
ZBJ-2

Radars
For radars deployed by PLAN, please refer to Chinese naval radars.

Sonars
Chinese sonar systems were initially based on Soviet supplied system, and during the 1980s, some western sonars were also imported, including Italian DE-1160, French DUBV23/43, SS-12, HS-312 etc.  Domestic Chinese sonars includes:

SJD-1
H/SJD-1 sonar is an indigenously developed bow mounted sonar, first of its kind in China.  Initial proposal of adopting Soviet Tamir-11(MG-11, NATO reporting name Stag Hoof) search light sonar was rejected, because it was not considered adequate enough due to its single beam search capability, which means the low speed of search cycle would easily lose targets. A more capable indigenous Chinese sonar was ordered to be developed, with Mr. Huo Guozheng (霍国正) named as the general designer. The resulting indigenous Chinese domestic sonar was SJD-1 low frequency (LF), high power, large aperture sonar with a cylindrical array (designated as Type 601 sonar array), which was accepted into service after eleven major trials at the sea. Type 601 sonar array of SJD-1 sonar has a diameter of 2 m, height of 1 m and weight of 4 tons, and the range is in excess of 6 nautical miles (nm), more than twice the range of Soviet Tamir/MG-11 search light sonar originally proposed. SJD-1 sonar was jointly developed by 706th Research Institute, 726th & 461th Factories, and it is the first bow mounted sonar adopted by Chinese navy. SJD-1 is frequently confused with its successor SJD-2, more commonly referred as SJD-II, whose design started in the 1970s, but was not completed until the 1980s due to major redesign. SJD-1 sonar was installed on Luda class destroyers and subsequently upgraded to SJD-2 in the 1980s.

SJD-N
It was discovered that SJD-1 sonar cannot provide accurate locations of targets, and the error was too great to be adequate enough to provide fire solutions to onboard ASW weapons. Therefore, the design of Type 051D incorporated an additional high frequency (HF) active attack sonar designated as SJD-N (with Type 675 sonar transducer array) to provide fire solutions, and this attack sonar was subsequently fitted on all Luda class ships. SJD-N was subsequently upgraded to SJD-4 standards.

SJD-2
H/SJD-2 sonar, more commonly known as SJD-II, whose design started in the 1970s, but was not completed until the 1980s due to major redesign, is frequently confused with its successor SJD-1.  SJD-2 is part of the effort (the other part being SJD-4) to improve the ASW capability of steam powered Chinese warships by incorporating Italian DE-1164 sonar technology.  DE-1164 consists of 2 subsystems using the same electrical cabinet, DE-1160 hull mounted sonar (HMS, with a maximum range around 20 km) and DE-1163 variable depth sonar (VDS, with a maximum range in excess of 50 km). DE-1164 is the first sonar in Chinese service to have integrated the HMS & VDS. ED-1164 was installed on Type 051 destroyer for evaluation.

Trials revealed that the performance of DE-1164 sonar was disappointing, with a huge gap between the actual performance and what was specified in documents. However, this was not due to sonar, but the ship itself. Due to the inherent flaws of an old design, the ship is not an ideal ASW platform for advanced ASW system. The steam propulsion system proved to be the major hindrance preventing DE-1164 reaching its full potential. The noise and vibration generated by the steam boilers simply created too much interference with the sensitive sonar that it could only reach its full potential at very low speed. However, at such low speed, target would easily evade and escape Luda's attempt to attack.  Test result led to two attempts to address the issue going in parallel: one of them was to upgrade SJD-1 with foreign technologies, and an addition of an attack sonar SJD-4.  SJD-2 is thus an upgrade package for older steam-powered warships.

SJD-3
H/SJD-3 sonar is the Chinese development of Soviet Tamir-11(MG-11) search light sonar.  SJD-3 hull mounted sonar differs from Soviet MG-11 in that instead of being fixed to the hull like the original MG-11, SJD-3 has a telescoping arm, so when not in use, the sonar is stored in the hull, and when deployed, the sonar is lowered into water several metres below the hull, thus increased detection range by avoiding baffles generated by the hull.

SJD-4
H/SJD-4 sonar resulted in the same experience of evaluation Italian DE-1164 sonar, which led to the development of SJD-2, the improvement of SJD-1.  SJD-4, in turn, is the corresponding upgrade of SJD-N, utilizing the technologies of DE-1164.

SJD-5
H/SJD-5 is the Chinese development of Soviet Tamir/MG-11, with transistors replacing vacuum tubes in the original Soviet MG-11, thus reduced size and weight and increase reliability.  SJD-5 sonar has several derivatives, including EH-5, with integrated circuits replacing transistors, which further developed into Echo Type 5, adopting LSIC technology.  The latest member is SJD-5A, with VLSIC technology.

SJD-7
H/SJD-7 is the Chinese development of Italian DE-1164 sonar, with additional noise cancellation and vibration reduction measures so that it can be used on older steam powered warship, whose steam propulsion system generates much greater noise and vibration than diesel and gas turbine propulsion system.

SJD-9
H/SJD-9 is the Chinese development of French DUBV23/43 hull mounted/VDS sonar system, incorporating same additional noise cancellation and vibration reduction measures for installation on steam powered warships.

ESS-1/2
ESS-1 sonar and ESS-2 sonar are Chinese VDS and hull mounted sonars (HMS) developed from similar western counterparts.  The origin of ESS-1 VDS and ESS-2 hull mounted sonar are subject to debate due to lack of official information, with some sources claim that ESS-2/1 are the Chinese version of DE-1160/1162 HMS/VDS, while others claim that it is the Chinese version of DUBV-23/43 HMS/VDS.   Since the Italian and French sonars have similar performance (20 km for HMS, and 50 km for VDS), it is difficult to determine which is which, since official Chinese governmental sources only confirms the 20/50 km ranges for HMS/VDS. ESS-2 sonar has bearing accuracy of 1 degree and like its predecessors SJD-1/2, it has a cylindrical transducer.

SO-7H
SO-7H sonar is the Chinese version of French DUBA 25 sonar.  As with SJD-7/9, SO-7H also incorporates additional vibration and noise reduction measures for upgrading older steam powered warships in Chinese navy.

SJG-206
H/SJG-206 is low frequency towed array sonar, the first towed sonar in China.  Developed by China Shipbuilding Industry Corporation, it won second place in National Science & Technology Advancement Award in 2003, and it equips many Chinese primary surface combatants.

TLAS-1
TLAS-1 sonar is the first Chinese towed array with a range of up to 45 km.  This passive low frequency sonar is able to simultaneously tracking 5 targets, with a bearing accuracy of 4 degrees, and it shares the same operator console as ESS-2 HMS.  This is a light towed system designed for smaller surface combatants.

SJG-208
H/SJG-208 is a towed sonar used by Chinese hydrographic and oceanographic survey ships, entered service in 1997, and its general designer is Mr. Li Qihu (李启虎), who is also the general designer of H/SQG-4 and H/SJG-206 sonars, and deputy general designer of H/SQG-207 sonar.

SQG-4
H/SQG-4 passive ranging sonar is also known as Type 204 sonar, it can be either used as part of H/SQZ-262 integrated sonar system, or as an independent system. Started in 1987, SQG-4 incorporated western technologies, namely French Thomson-CSF DUUX-5, and it deploys three arrays on each side of the submarine.

SQZ-262
H/SQZ-262 sonar is a fully digitized, integrated submarine sonar designed by Acoustic Research Institute of Chinese Academy of Sciences. Three versions of H/SQZ-262 was developed, with SQZ-262A replacing Type 105 sonar on Type 033 class submarine, SQZ-262B replacing Type 603 & 604 sonars on Han class and Xia class nuclear submarine, and SQZ-262C installed on Type 035G Ming class submarine.

SQG-207
H/SQG-207 flank array is a flank sonar newly developed by 715th Research Institute, first equipped Chinese nuclear submarine, and then conventional submarines during refits, it is the first flank sonar in China.

Synthetic Aperture Sonar (SAS)
Chinese synthetic aperture sonar (CSAS) is a SAS developed by a team led by Acoustic Research Institute of Chinese Academy of Sciences, partnered with the 715th Research Institute of China Shipbuilding Industry Corporation.  The program first begun in Jul 1997 one of the 863 Programs, and the general designer of CSAS was Chinese academician of sciences Mr. Li Qihu (李启虎), also the general designer of H/SQZ-262 sonar.  In comparison to imported SHADOWS SAS developed by French firm IXBLUE, CSAS has higher resolutions: the model of CSAS that utilizes both the medium and low frequencies has a resolution of 0.1 m, as opposed to 0.15 m of SHADOWS SAS. The model of CSAS that utilizes high frequency has a highest resolution to 5 cm x 3.75 cm.

SAS for AUV
China has also developed a miniature SAS for autonomous underwater vehicles(AUVs).  Developed by the Information and Communication Engineering Research Institute of Zhejiang University as part of one of the Project 985 programs, the general designer of Chinese SAS for AUV is Professor Mr. Xu Wen (徐文) of Zhejiang University.

XT02WR01
XT02WR01 sonar is a diver detection sonar (DDS) developed by (Beijing) New Source Yongtai Electro-optics Science and Technologies Development Co. Ltd. (北京新源永泰光电科技发展有限责任公司) in Beijing.  The system can cover up to 150 hectares of area, with an effective range against a diver at 400 to 700 m (w/ errors of 0.5 m in distance, 15 m in bearing).  The size of the system (wet end) is very compact, weight less than 50 kg, with a diameter of 0.5 m and a height of 0.65 m. The wet end only need 200 W of power, same as an ordinary household television, with 220 V power source. The wet end of XT02WR01 sonar can be deployed in a depth up to 40 m deep and can operate in sea state 4 continuously for 3 years, and the entire system can be fully autonomous, operating without any human intervention.  The dry end of XT02WR01 sonar system has numerous options based on customer demands, linked to the wet end via waterproof fiber-optics cables.

Tronka
Tronka sonar is a DDS jointly developed by Ukraine and China.  The systems weigh 415 kg (115 kg for wet end, 300 for dry end), and can be deployed in a depth up to 20 m.  The effective range is 0.5 km, with an accuracy of 1.5% in range, 2 degrees in azimuth. The height of the wet end is 1.5 m, and the service life of the system is 10 years.

Underwater Security System
Underwater Security System (USS) is an indigenous Chinese nonlethal diver repellant system developed domestically by a joint team of Institute of Acoustics (中科院声学所) of Chinese Academy of Sciences (CAS), Shanghai Ship & Shipping Research Institute (上海船舶运输科学研究所) of China Shipping Group, and Xi’an (Research) Institute of Optics and Precision Mechanics (西安光学精密机械研究所) of CAS.  The general designer of USS is Mr.Xu Feng (许枫, Jun 1969 -).  The detection subsystem of USS consists of both the stationary and mobile sonars.  USS has been first deployed in 2008 Olympic games in Chinese port cities hosting water sports, and has since been adopted subsequently by Chinese law enforcement, para-military and military establishments.

Harbor Underwater Frogmen Detection System
Harbor Underwater Frogmen Detection System (HUFDS) is a DDS system actively marketed in China by its developer, Beijing Time Frequency Technology Co., Ltd (北京泰富坤科技有限公司) in Beijing.

SGP
SGP side scan sonar (SSS) is a family of SSS developed by South China University of Technology led by the general designer Mr. Lin Zhenbiao (林振镳), and a total of 3 generations of SGP SSS has been developed since program first begun in 1971, including SGP-I/II/III (SGP-1/2/3), with SGP-3 being successfully used in mine detection.  The predecessor of SGP-3, the SGP-1 SSS works at two frequencies, 160-190 kHz and 25-30 kHz.

CS-1
CS-1 is a side scan sonar developed by Institute of Acoustics (中科院声学所) of Chinese Academy of Sciences (CAS).  CS-1 system consists of computer-based sonar processor, the sonar receiver board, data acquisition board, extended I/O interface board, thermal line scan recorder, tow-fish, tow cable and winch etc. CS-1 is deployed for survey missions.

Portable SSS
Portable side scan sonar is developed by Institute of Acoustics (中科院声学所) of Chinese Academy of Sciences (CAS), based on experience gained from CS-1 SSS developed by the same team.  Portable SSS is primarily designed as a rapid deployment system that can be readily installed on surface platform, so that it would complement larger systems such as CS-1 which required more dedicated platform.  The maximum range is 200 meter, and maximum working depth is 100 meter, highest resolution is 0.5 degree, diameter is 0.1 meter, working frequency is 200 kHz and the total system weight is less than 30 kg.

HRBSSS
HRBSSS stands for High Resolution Bathymetric Side Scan Sonar, and it is jointly developed by Institute of Acoustics (中科院声学所) of Chinese Academy of Sciences (CAS) and Teledyne RD Instruments (RDI) @ Shanghai. The resolution is 5 cm, working frequency is 150 kHz, and range is 2 x 400 m, maximum working depth is up to 6000 m, and HRBSSS can track multiple targets simultaneously.

SQX-1
H/SQX-1 sonar is a communication sonar for underwater communications, with the transducer reportedly designed as Type 063.

SQC-1
H/SQC-1 sonar (with transducer designated as Type 604) is a passive sonar installed on first generation Chinese nuclear submarines when they were first launched, and it is no longer in service, replaced by H/SQZ-262B.

SQZ-3
H/SQZ-3 sonar (with transducer designated as Type 603) is an active sonar installed on first generation Chinese nuclear submarines when they were first launched, and it is no longer in service, replaced by H/SQZ-262B.

SQZ-D
H/SQZ-D sonar (with transducer designated as Type 105) is a sonar for older generations of diesel submarines and it is no longer in service, being replaced by H/SQZ-262A.  The performance of SQZ is almost identical to the original Soviet sonar it was developed from, except the sector of scan, which is increased by 15 degrees.  The volume and weight is also decreased considerably when the original vacuum tubes of the original Soviet sonar (Tamir 5L, NATO reporting name: Perch Gill) was replaced by transistors and integrated circuits.

SQC-1
H/SQC-1 reconnaissance sonar is no longer in service when its functions can be performed as part of that of H/SQZ-262 sonar.

Type 801
Type 801 sonar is a Chinese development of Soviet MARS-24 sonar for diesel submarines.  Type 801 provide azimuth of targets and it is a passive system.  The only difference between Type 801 sonar and its predecessor MARS-24 sonar is that there are 24 transducer elements for Type 801 as opposed to 12 in the original MARS 24, so the Chinese sonar had better accuracy.

SQG-2
H/SQG-2 sonar is the first domestically developed indigenous Chinese passive ranging sonar, developed to complement Type 801 passive sonar, which could only provide azimuth, but not ranging.  SQG-2 is a ranging only sonar that is no longer in service, being replaced by more advanced development.

SQZ-1
H/SQZ-1 sonar is an integrated sonar system that integrates Type 801, SQC-1, SQG-2 and SQZ-D sonars so the overall combat effectiveness is improved, in comparison to the old practice of each sonar working separately and info obtained from each individual system must be manually interpreted to form an overall picture.  SQZ-1 is no longer in service and has been replaced by SQZ-262 sonar.

Diver propulsion vehicles
All confirmed DPVs in Chinese service are developed by the Kunming Wuwei Science & Technology Trade Co., Ltd at Kunming, a solely owned subsidiary of Kunming 705th (Research) Institute Science & Technology Development Co. (昆明七零五所科技发展总公司) at Kunming, which in turn, is a company wholly owned by the 705th Research Institute (headquartered in Xi'an) of the China Shipbuilding Industry Corporation.  All DPV/SDVs (swimmer transportation devices) fielded by this contractor are developed by the design team with the following members: Liu Ning (刘宁), You Yun (犹云), Jin Zhongxian (金仲贤), Chen Haizhen (陈海珍), and Zhang Chun (张春). A total of 4 DPVs have been identified in Chinese naval service:

QY18 DPV
One man DPV/SDV weighing < 20 kg. Length: 0.8 m, diameter: 0.385 m, speed: 2 kn, endurance: > 1 hr, depth: 40 m.

QY40 DPV
One man DPV/SDV weighing < 40 kg. Length: 1.2 m, diameter: 0.32 m, speed: 2 kn, endurance: > 1.5 hr, depth: 40 m.

QX50 DPV
One man DPV/SDV weighing < 50 kg. Length: 1.6 m, diameter: 0.23 m, speed: 2 kn, endurance: > 2 hr, depth: 40 m.

QJY-001 DPV
Two man DPV weighing < 90 kg. Length: < 2.3 m, diameter: < 0.53 m, max speed: 4 m/s, cruise speed: 2.7 kn for 1 person, 2 kn for 2 people, endurance: > 9 km @ 2 kn, depth: 30 m, sea state: 3.

In addition to the DPVs currently in the Chinese naval inventory, Glory International Group Ltd in Beijing is also marketing two of its DPVs, (GL602 and GL603), to the Chinese military.

Unmanned underwater vehicles (UUVs)
The following unmanned underwater vehicle(UUV)s have been confirmed in Chinese service:

Future weapons systems
The current quality and capability of PLAN weaponry has improved significantly, closing the gaps between PLAN obsolescence and Western standards. Future PLAN weapon systems could include land attack cruise missiles, stealthy hypersonic missiles, armed ship-launched UAVs, anti radiation missiles, and land based anti-ship ballistic missiles, EMP bombs, long-range artillery systems, super-speed torpedoes and improved mines.

References 

Naval weaponry of the People's Republic of China